Void Indigo was a short-lived and controversial comic book series written by Steve Gerber and drawn by Val Mayerik. It was published by Epic Comics from 1983 to 1984.

Void Indigo focuses on an alien named Jhagur (he is known on Earth as "Mick Jagger"). Jhagur had been a human on Earth in a previous incarnation, and he returns to Earth with a spirit of vengeance against the four wizards who had tortured and killed him in his previous life. He comes to Los Angeles at the end of the graphic novel.

Publishing history
Gerber initially shopped the story to independent publishers as well as DC Comics, but could not come to an agreement. He brought it to Marvel Comics, a company he had recently quit.

Originally a pitch for revamping DC Comics' Hawkman, Gerber reworked the story into one of the first graphic novels (Marvel Graphic Novel #11) published by Epic Comics in 1983. It was then meant to spin out into a six-issue limited series by Epic. There were minor references implying that the story was set in the Marvel Universe in spite of it being a creator-owned title.

Due to the comic's extreme (for the time) portrayal of violence, however, distributor reaction to the first issue of the limited series was negative. Critical reaction was harsh for the same reason: in his Comics Buyer's Guide column, "The Law is a Ass", Bob Ingersoll cited the book as being a "crime against humanity". In revisiting his columns a decade later, Ingersoll edited his criticism to take out "very inappropriate" assumptions about Gerber, although he still found the series to be "pustulate".

Orders for the second issue dropped due to negative reviews, and Epic's editor-in-chief Archie Goodwin considered it not worth publishing the rest of the series due to the pressures he and the company were under. Issues #3–6 were never completed, although the synopsis was later leaked onto the Internet, providing an idea as to how the series would have finished.

References

External links

1983 comics debuts
Marvel Comics graphic novels
Marvel Comics limited series
Comics by Steve Gerber
Defunct American comics
Unpublished comics
Science fantasy comics